Donald MacKay Fraser (February 20, 1924 – June 2, 2019) was an American politician from Minnesota who served as U.S. Representative from Minnesota's 5th congressional district from 1963 to 1979 and as mayor of Minneapolis from 1980 to 1994.

Early life

Fraser was born in Minneapolis, Minnesota, to Everett and Lois (McKay) Fraser, immigrants from Canada. His father studied law at Harvard University, began teaching at George Washington University and became dean of the University of Minnesota Law School in 1920. Fraser graduated from University High School in 1941 and that year, he entered the University of Minnesota. During college, he was a member of the varsity swimming team.

Having joined the US Navy ROTC, he was placed on active duty in July 1942 and continued his naval studies on campus until February 1944, when he was commissioned an officer and sent to the Pacific Theater during World War II. Fraser worked as a radar officer into the peacetime that followed, ending in 1946. In June 1946 Fraser returned to Minneapolis to study law at the University of Minnesota Law School.

Fraser served as a member of the Minnesota Law Review and wrote a law review article on the illegality of racial covenants for land, a position supported by the United States Supreme Court in 1948. Fraser earned his law degree and was admitted to the bar, the same year. He joined the politically active firm of Larson, Loevinger, Lindquist, Freeman, and Fraser. Fraser engaged in general law practice and served as municipal attorney for the suburban community of Brooklyn Center, Minnesota. He married Arvonne Skelton in 1950 and the following year, they had the first of their six children: Thomas, Mary, John, Lois, Anne, and Jean.

Political career

In 1954, Fraser was elected to the Minnesota Senate and served for eight years. In 1962, he was elected to the U.S. House of Representatives from Minnesota's Fifth District. He served there in the 88th through the 95th Congresses, from January 3, 1963 until January 3, 1979. Fraser is now best known for his work as the chair of the International Organizations and Movements subcommittee, a post he used to hold hearings on human rights violations in U.S. allies. As the historian Barbara Keys has shown, from 1973 to 1976, Fraser was a key leader in Congress in drafting legislation to reduce U.S. aid to countries whose governments engaged in a pattern of "gross violations of human rights." His efforts laid the foundations for much of Jimmy Carter's human rights agenda and transformed the way the U.S. Department of State operates, mandating that it write annual country reports on human rights and ensuring that diplomatic posts take note of human rights issues. He gave up his seat to run for the U.S. Senate. He narrowly lost the 1978 Senate primary election to Bob Short, who then lost in the general election to David Durenberger.

Fraser served as president of Americans for Democratic Action from 1974 to 1976. He was elected mayor of Minneapolis in 1979, taking office on January 2, 1980. His first mayoral term was two years; he was re-elected to three four-year terms. He was the oldest, longest-lived and longest-serving mayor in Minneapolis history. He left office on January 3, 1994, and was succeeded by the city's first female and first African-American mayor, Sharon Sayles Belton.

Fraser died on June 2, 2019, at age 95.

Papers
His papers are available for research. The collection is particularly strong in its documentation of international relations, Democratic Party policy and reform, human rights issues, environmental conservation, and women's issues, in the 1960s and 1970s.

Endorsement of United Nations Parliamentary Assembly (UNPA)
On April 23, 2014, Fraser endorsed the proposal for the United Nations Parliamentary Assembly. He is one of only six people who served in Congress to do so.

See also

McGovern–Fraser Commission

References

External links
 Minnesota Legislators Past and Present
 
 Kerr, Euan, "Fraser remembered as 'quiet giant' of Minnesota politics".  Minnesota Public Radio News, June 3, 2019.

|-

|-

|-

1924 births
2019 deaths
Democratic Party members of the United States House of Representatives from Minnesota
Lawyers from Minneapolis
Mayors of Minneapolis
Military personnel from Minneapolis
Democratic Party Minnesota state senators
People from Brooklyn Center, Minnesota
Politicians from Minneapolis
United States Navy officers
University of Minnesota Law School alumni
American people of Canadian descent
20th-century American lawyers
United States Navy personnel of World War II